The Church of Mary Magdalene of Buda is one of the oldest churches of the Várkerület District (Buda Castle District). Dedicated to Jesus' follower, Mary Magdalene, it was built between the 13th and 15th centuries in Gothic style. Today only ruins and the tower of the church remains.

For centuries, the Church of Mary Magdalene was the forum of the population of Buda District. Then, the church became the site of the coronation of Francis II, Holy Roman Emperor as Hungarian king, and finally as the central church of the garrison of the Buda Castle.

History
In the 13th century, after the Mongol destruction of the Buda Castle, the church was built in the Castle Hill (Várhegy), which between the second half of the 13th century and today the hill remain similar: the royal accommodation in the south, the Church of the Assumption (Matthias Church), and to the north the Church of Mary Magdalene. The Church of the Blessed Virgin was for the German-speaking that lived in Budapest and the Church of Mary Magdalene was the church of the Hungarian population. At that time, the northern part of the castle hill was called Szombathely Square, which used to host the grand fairs on Saturday, which ran from today's Vienna Gate to Úri Street and included the then vacant lot of the Lutheran church. At the southwestern corner of the square was the Gothic church, originally of a one nave and then in 1400 was expanded. According to contemporary depictions, the tower was covered with a pyramid. 

A series of alterations were completed at the late-15th century, this is the time when the late Gothic church consisting of six vault sections and with an expanded presbytery.

During the Fifteen Years' War (1591-1606) the building was taken away from Christians and was later known as a Muslim place of worship known as Fetih (Victory) and Saat (Time).

The church was owned by the Franciscans between 1698-1786 and was used for archival material. After a decree of Joseph II, Holy Roman Emperor in 1786, which finished the Franciscan order ownership, the church during many years was used for the preservation of archival material, and in 1792 was crowned here Francis II, Holy Roman Emperor (then was built a lobby in Zopf style, with covered driveways). Ignác Martinovics was deprived of his priestly dignity here, and a lawsuit against his participants who led the Jacobin Movement of Hungary took place in this monastery where prisoners were kept. In 1817 the Buda headquarters was moved to the monastery and the church became the garrison church, where military services were held. The driveways were demolished, and in the 1820s the onion dome was replaced by a bell tower.

In the 1920s it received a night-time decorative lighting and a heating system, but no changes were made to the building. In 1938 the church was turned into a museum. During the Allied Siege of Budapest of 1944 several bombs hit the building: cracks appeared on the tower; the northwest corner of the floor collapsed; the roof of its long house, the walls of the sanctuary and the chapels were almost completely collapsed. However, the real destruction of the Church of Mary Magdalene was not by the war but the "restoration" of the 1950s: in vain in 1946 Kálmán Lux made the plan to restore the church, in vain the rebuilding of the roof and the shrine began in 1950, and the church building was demolished at the personal request of Mátyás Rákosi, an anti-church communist regime. Only its bell tower and the side chapels escaped from the destruction, thanks to József Csemegi for its rescue as a Rákosi pantheon.

In 1986, the ruin garden was formed in front of the tower, showing the floor plan of a one nave church. The size of the former church is illustrated by the Gothic sanctuary window set up opposite the tower. 

In 1956, a mine blast struck the tower pile, then it was restored. Plans have been made for the functions of the church were expanded, and finally a store selling minerals, jewelry and artwork operated in the tower for a few years. The rebuilding of the temple was proposed in 1989, when the design of a three-nave Gothic-style building with a glass facade of chrome steel was revealed. The idea was soon forgotten, and the structure of the church was not reopened until 1999.

At the request of the College of the Ministry of Defense, architect Mihály Balázs, co-designer of the Church of the Hungarian Saints in Lágymányos, made plans for the reconstruction. According to Balázs's plans, he would have restored the Gothic tower with a suitable Goulash dome, and would have built a new church nave that would fill the gap in the square, which would fit the mass and height of the surrounding buildings. It does not take a stand in either the Gothic state, with its asymmetrical proportions and heights of the ledge, and it is abundant in contemporary solutions. The main nave would have been joined by a historic museum building.

However, due to personnel changes at the Ministry of Defense, the plan has been "postponed" for several years. The basic concept, however, has been attacked by many: "what is the need for a church of this size in the Castle District, with more churches, but lacking basic tourist functions, for example?" Since then, a gallery has been operating in the tower, but anyone can rent it for organizing an event, although heating is not possible.

For the last time, during Heritage Days, they wanted to "rebuild" the church, albeit for a few minutes, using laser technology; but the wind that blown out the artificial smoke and the blackout prevented it, in any case, thanks to the combination of the tower, the ruin garden and the sanctuary window, the former claims of the former church lady; or as Antal Szerb wrote in 1935, entitled "Budapest Guide for Mariners" series, "of the magnificently large, yet complete building: Westminster Abbey bigger, but there will be no man next to it […] Cross and flee."

Gallery

References

External links

Roman Catholic churches in Budapest
Gothic architecture in Hungary
15th-century Roman Catholic church buildings in Hungary
Towers completed in the 15th century